Riding the California Trail is a 1947 American Western film directed by William Nigh and written by Clarence Upson Young. The film stars Gilbert Roland as the Cisco Kid, Martin Garralaga, Frank Yaconelli, Teala Loring, Inez Cooper and Ted Hecht. The film was released on January 11, 1947, by Monogram Pictures.

Plot

Cast           
Gilbert Roland as The Cisco Kid / Don Luis Salazar
Martin Garralaga as Don José Ramirez
Frank Yaconelli as Baby 
Teala Loring as Raquel
Inez Cooper as Delores Ramirez
Ted Hecht as Don Raoul Pedro Reyes
Marcelle Grandville as Dueña Rosita

References

External links
 

1947 films
1940s English-language films
American Western (genre) films
1947 Western (genre) films
Monogram Pictures films
Films directed by William Nigh
American black-and-white films
1940s American films